A freelancer is a person who pursues an occupation without a long-term commitment to any particular employer.

Freelance or Freelancer may also refer to:

 Freelancer.com, a freelance marketplace website
 Freelance (1971 film), a British thriller
 Freelance (2007 film), a low-budget independent comedy
 Freelance (upcoming film), an American action-comedy 
 Freelancers (film), a 2012 American crime drama
 Freelancers (TV series), a 2019 comedy series
 Freelancer (video game), a 2003 space simulation video game
 Freelance, the local title for Heart Attack, a 2015 romantic Thai film

See also